The 1972 BC Lions finished in fifth place in the Western Conference with a 5–11 record and failed to make the playoffs.  

After Paul Brothers was traded to Ottawa late in the 1971 season and Tom Wilkinson was released, sophomore pivot Don Moorhead became the Lions' starting quarterback. While Moorhead threw for 2606 yards, he also threw 17 interceptions and the offence continued to struggle at only 15.9 points per game.

The lone bright spot on offence was receiver Jim Young. He led the league with 1362 yards receiving and won his second Schenley as Outstanding Canadian. Young was a CFL all-star along with rookie linebacker Ray Nettles, for whom the Lions outbid the Miami Dolphins of the NFL in the off-season.

For the first season since the 1950s, the team wore orange jerseys at home. The new jerseys had northwestern stripes on each arm.

Offseason

CFL Draft

Preseason

Regular season

Season standings

Season schedule

Offensive leaders

Awards and records
CFL's Most Outstanding Canadian Award – Jim Young (WR)

1972 CFL All-Stars
WR – Jim Young, CFL All-Star
LB – Ray Nettles, CFL All-Star

References

BC Lions seasons
1972 Canadian Football League season by team
1972 in British Columbia